Rasmus Carstensen (born 1 January 2000) is a Danish professional footballer who plays as a right-back for Belgian Pro League club Genk.

Club career

Silkeborg
Born in Virklund, 6 kilometres (3.7 mi) south of Silkeborg, Central Jutland, Carstensen initially played youth football at local club Virklund IF, before moving to the Silkeborg IF youth academy at age 13.

After practicing with the first team, he signed a one-year contract on 6 February 2019, and made his debut on 20 March at the age of 19 in a 2–0 away loss to Lyngby Boldklub in the second-tier Danish 1st Division. With Silkeborg, Carstensen won promotion to the top-tier Danish Superliga at the end of the season, where he initially remained on the bench before finally emerging in the starting lineup in the relegation round. However, with Carstensen in the starting lineup, Silkeborg could not prevent relegation back to the 1st Division. After the contract had meanwhile been extended to 2021, he signed another contract extension on 24 July 2020, keeping him part of the club until 2024.

Genk
On 9 August 2022 it was confirmed that Carstensen had joined Belgian First Division A side Genk on a deal until 2026.

International career
On 4 September 2020, Carstensen made his debut for the Denmark under-21 team in a 1–1 draw in the 2021 UEFA European Under-21 Championship qualifier against Ukraine in Aalborg.

Honours
Silkeborg
 Danish 1st Division: 2019–20

References

External links
 
 

Living people
2000 births
People from Silkeborg Municipality
Sportspeople from the Central Denmark Region
Danish men's footballers
Association football defenders
Denmark under-21 international footballers
Danish Superliga players
Danish 1st Division players
Challenger Pro League players
Silkeborg IF players
K.R.C. Genk players
Jong Genk players
Danish expatriate men's footballers
Danish expatriate sportspeople in Belgium
Expatriate footballers in Belgium